Desha: The Leader is a 2014 Bangladeshi political thriller film produced by Jaaz Multimedia. The film was scripted and directed by Saikat Nasir and features a cast that includes newcomer Shipan Mitra, Mahiya Mahi, and Tariq Anam Khan. Desha: The Leader is a story about a political reality show that turns severe. The film was released on 26 December 2014. It won four National Film Awards.

Plot
Channel 99 arranges a reality show, to select the next leader by SMS voting of people all over the world. The elected leader will stay on the person's house for two days, who will vote for the maximum times by SMS.

Cast
 Shipan Mitra as Selim/Desha
 Mahiya Mahi as The Presenter
 Tariq Anam Khan as Hasan Hyder
 Manjurul Karim
 Tiger Robi as Darbar
 Shimul Khan

Production

Release
The film opened in Bangladesh on Friday, 26 December 2014 in at least 60 theaters.

Reception

The New Nation reported that audiences reacted positively to the pairing of Shipan and Mahi.

Critical response
Abdullah Al Amin (Rubel) of The Daily Star gave the film two stars out of five. Although he found Tariq Anam Khan's performance "absolutely superb" and lauded the concept for its originality, the weak screenplay, direction, and cinematography "meant this movie just couldn't be the hit it could have been."

Accolades
At the 39th Bangladesh National Film Awards, Desha: The Leader won in four categories. Tariq Anam Khan won Best Actor in a Negative Role. James received his first National Award, Best Male Playback Singer, for the song "Ashche Desha Ashche". Nasir won Best Cinematography, and Towhid Hossain Chowdhury won Best Editing.

Soundtracks
Abdullah Al Amin (Rubel) of The Daily Star praised the one song by James, but considered the rest of the soundtrack lackluster.

References

2014 films
2010s political thriller films
Bengali-language Bangladeshi films
Bangladeshi political thriller films
Films scored by Shafiq Tuhin
2010s Bengali-language films
2014 directorial debut films
Best Film Bachsas Award winners
Jaaz Multimedia films